Barbuda Codrington Airport  is a public airport serving the village of Codrington, on the island of Barbuda. It has a very short runway.

In September 2017, Hurricane Irma seriously damaged Barbuda Codrington Airport, and as a result, Antiguan and Barbudan authorities shut down the airport until repairs were completed.

Airlines and destinations

References

External links 

Airports in Antigua and Barbuda
Airports in Barbuda
Codrington